McClinton Earl Neal (born July 11, 1968, in Dallas, Texas) is an American track and field athlete, know primarily for running the 400 metres hurdles.  He represented the United States at the 1992 Olympics. The previous year he earned a silver medal at the 1991 Pan Am Games.

While running for the University of Texas, Arlington, he was the 1990 NCAA Champion. Neal ran his professional career with the Santa Monica Track Club, retiring in 2000.

Since the Olympics Neal has performed stand-up comedy professionally and appeared on General Hospital, The Young and the Restless and in an episode of Arli$$.

References

External links

1968 births
Living people
African-American male track and field athletes
American male hurdlers
Athletes (track and field) at the 1992 Summer Olympics
Olympic track and field athletes of the United States
Track and field athletes from Dallas
Pan American Games silver medalists for the United States
Pan American Games medalists in athletics (track and field)
Athletes (track and field) at the 1991 Pan American Games
Medalists at the 1991 Pan American Games
21st-century African-American people
20th-century African-American sportspeople